Sphacanthus is a genus of flowering plants belonging to the family Acanthaceae.

Its native range is Madagascar.

Species
Species:

Sphacanthus brillantaisia 
Sphacanthus humbertii

References

Acanthaceae
Acanthaceae genera